The siege of Fort William Henry (3–9 August 1757) was conducted by a French and Indian force led by Louis-Joseph de Montcalm against the British-held Fort William Henry.  The fort, located at the southern end of Lake George, on the frontier between the British Province of New York and the French Province of Canada, was garrisoned by a poorly supported force of British regulars and provincial militia led by Lieutenant Colonel George Monro.

After several days of bombardment, Monro surrendered to Montcalm, whose force included nearly 2,000 Indians from various tribes.  The terms of surrender included the withdrawal of the garrison to Fort Edward, with specific terms that the French military protect the British from the Indians as they withdrew from the area.

In one of the most notorious incidents of the French and Indian War, Montcalm's Indian allies violated the agreed terms of surrender and attacked the departing British column, which had been deprived of ammunition, as it left the fort.  They killed and scalped numerous soldiers and civilians, took as captives women, children, servants, and slaves, and slaughtered sick and wounded prisoners.  Early accounts of the events called it a massacre and implied that as many as 1,500 people were killed, although it is unlikely more than 200 people (less than 10% of the British fighting strength) were actually killed in the massacre.

The exact role of Montcalm and other French officers present in encouraging or defending against the actions of their allies, and the total number of casualties incurred as a result of their actions, is a subject of historical debate.  The memory of the killings influenced the actions of British military commanders, especially those of General Jeffery Amherst, for the remainder of the war.

Background
The French and Indian War started in 1754 over territorial disputes between the North American colonies of France and Great Britain in areas that are now western Pennsylvania and upstate New York. The war began after George Washington attacked, captured, and massacred French forces at the Battle of Jumonville Glen, while Britain and France were still at peace. The first few years of the war did not go particularly well for the British.  A major expedition by General Edward Braddock in 1755 ended in disaster, and British military leaders were unable to mount any campaigns the following year.  In a major setback, a French and Indian army led by General Louis-Joseph de Montcalm captured the garrison and destroyed fortifications in the Battle of Fort Oswego in August 1756.  In July 1756 the Earl of Loudoun arrived to take command of the British forces in North America, replacing William Shirley, who had temporarily assumed command after Braddock's death.

British planning
Loudoun's plan for the 1757 campaign was submitted to the government in London in September 1756, and was focused on a single expedition aimed at the heart of New France, the city of Quebec. It called for a purely defensive postures along the frontier with New France, including the contested corridor of the Hudson River and Lake Champlain between Albany, New York and Montreal. The area between William Henry and Carillon was a wilderness dominated by Lake George that historian Ian Steele described as "a military waterway that left opposing cannons only a few days apart."

Loudoun's plan depended on the expedition's timely arrival at Quebec, so that French troops would not have the opportunity to move against targets on the frontier, and would instead be needed to defend the heartland of the province of Canada along the Saint Lawrence River.  However, political turmoil in London over the progress of the Seven Years' War both in North America and in Europe resulted in a change of power, with William Pitt the Elder rising to take control over military matters.  Loudoun consequently did not receive any feedback from London on his proposed campaign until March 1757.  Before this feedback arrived he developed plans for the expedition to Quebec, and worked with the provincial governors of the Thirteen Colonies to develop plans for a coordinated defence of the frontier, including the allotment of militia quotas to each province.

When William Pitt's instructions finally reached Loudoun in March 1757, they called for the expedition to first target Louisbourg on the Atlantic coast of Île Royale, now known as Cape Breton Island.  Although this did not materially affect the planning of the expedition, it was to have significant consequences on the frontier.  The French forces on the Saint Lawrence would be too far from Louisbourg to support it, and would consequently be free to act elsewhere.  Loudoun assigned his best troops to the Louisbourg expedition, and placed Brigadier General Daniel Webb in command of the New York frontier.  He was given about 2,000 regulars, primarily from the 35th and 60th (Royal American) Regiments.  The provinces were to supply Webb with about 5,000 militia.

French planning

Following the success of his 1756 assault on Fort Oswego, Montcalm had been seeking an opportunity to deal with the British position at Fort William Henry, since it provided the British with a launching point for attacks against Fort Carillon (now known as Fort Ticonderoga).  He was initially hesitant to commit his limited resources against Fort William Henry without knowing more about the disposition of British forces.  Intelligence provided by spies in London arrived in the spring, indicating that the British target was probably Louisbourg.  This suggested that troop levels on the British side of the frontier might be low enough to make an attack on Fort William Henry feasible.  This idea was further supported after the French questioned deserters and captives taken during periodic scouting and raiding expeditions that both sides conducted, including one resulting in the January Battle on Snowshoes.

As early as December 1756, New France's governor, the Marquis de Vaudreuil, began the process of recruiting Indians for the following summer's campaign.  Fueled by stories circulated by Indian participants in the capture of Oswego, this drive was highly successful, drawing nearly 1,000 warriors from the Pays d'en Haut (the more remote regions of New France) to Montreal by June 1757.  Another 800 Indians were recruited from tribes that lived closer to the Saint Lawrence.

British preparations

Fort William Henry, built in the fall of 1755, was a roughly square fortification with bastions on the corners, in a design that was intended to repel Indian attacks but was not necessarily sufficient to withstand attack from an enemy that had artillery. Inside the fort were wooden barracks two stories high, built around the parade ground. Its magazine was in the northeast bastion, and its hospital was located in the southeast bastion. The fort was surrounded on three sides by a dry moat, with the fourth side sloping down to the lake. The only access to the fort was by a bridge across the moat.

During the winter of 1756–57, Fort William Henry was garrisoned by several hundred men from the 44th Foot under Major Will Eyre.  In March 1757 the French sent an army of 1,500 to attack the fort under the command of the governor's brother, Pierre de Rigaud.  Composed primarily of colonial troupes de la marine, militia, and Indians, and without heavy weapons, they besieged the fort for four days, destroying outbuildings and many watercraft before retreating.  Eyre and his men were replaced by Lieutenant Colonel George Monro and the 35th Foot in the spring.  Monro established his headquarters in the entrenched camp, where most of his men were located.

French preparations
The Indians that assembled at Montreal were sent south to Fort Carillon, where they joined the French regiments of Béarn and Royal Roussillon under François-Charles de Bourlamaque, and those of La Sarre, Guyenne, Languedoc, and la Reine under François de Gaston, Chevalier de Lévis.  Combined with the troupes de la marine, militia companies, and the arriving Indians, the force accumulated at Carillon amounted to 8,000 men.

While at Carillon, the French leadership had difficulty controlling the behaviour of its Indian allies.  Although they did stop one group from forcing a British prisoner to run the gantlet, a group of Ottawas were not stopped when it was observed that they were ritually cannibalizing another prisoner. French authorities were also frustrated in their ability to limit the Indians' taking of more than their allotted share of rations. Montcalm's aide, Louis Antoine de Bougainville, observed that attempts to curb this activity would have resulted in the loss of some of these forces.  In another prelude of things to come, many prisoners were taken on 23 July in the Battle of Sabbath Day Point, some of whom were also ritually cannibalized before Montcalm managed to convince the Indians instead to send the captives to Montreal to be sold as slaves.

Prelude
Webb, who commanded the area from his base at Fort Edward, received intelligence in April that the French were accumulating resources and troops at Carillon. News of continued French activity arrived with a captive taken in mid-July. Following an attack by Joseph Marin de la Malgue on a work crew near Fort Edward on 23 July, Webb travelled to Fort William Henry with a party of Connecticut rangers led by Major Israel Putnam, and sent a detachment of them onto the lake for reconnaissance. Swearing Putnam and his rangers to secrecy, Webb returned to Fort Edward, and on 2 August sent Lieutenant Colonel John Young with 200 regulars and 800 Massachusetts militia to reinforce the garrison at William Henry. This raised the size of the garrison to about 2,500, although several hundred of these were ill, some with smallpox.

Order of Battle 
British Forces

 British Forces, commanded by Lieutenant Colonel George Monro
 35th Regiment of Foot
 1st Battalion, Massachusetts Provincial Forces (about 450 x men), commanded by Colonel Timothy Ruggles
 2nd Battalion, Massachusetts Provincial Forces (about 450 x men), commanded by Colonel Moses Titcomb
 3rd Battalion, Massachusetts Provincial Forces (about 450 x men), commanded by Colonel Ephraim Williams (KIA)
 1st Battalion, Connecticut Provincial Forces (about 450 x men), commanded by Major General Phineas Lyman
 2nd Battalion, Connecticut Provincial Forces (about 450 x men), commanded by Lieutenant Colonel Whiting
 5 x Companies, Rhode Island Provincial Forces (about 250 x men), commanded by Lieutenant Colonel Cole
 3 x Companies, New York Provincial Forces (about 200 x men)
 250 x Mohawk Native Americans

French Forces

 French Forces, commanded by Général de Division Ludwig August, Baron von Dieskau
 2 x Companies, Régiment de Languedoc
 2 x Companies, Régiment de La Reine
 12 x Men, Troupes de la Marine
 684 x Canadian Militiamen (unknown battalions and brigades)
 Approximately 1800 Indians from the Ottawa, Abenaki, Potawatomis and Nipissing tribes
 En-route: Corps Royal from the Fortress of Louisbourg
 6 x Officers
 400 x Recruits
 20 x Artillerymen
 2 x Battalions, Régiment de Berry

Siege

While Montcalm's Indian allies had already begun to move south, his advance force of French troops departed from Carillon on 30 July under Lévis' command, travelling overland along Lake George's western shore because the expedition did not have enough boats to carry the entire force.  Montcalm and the remaining forces sailed the next day, and met with Lévis for the night at Ganaouske Bay.  The next night, Lévis camped just  from Fort William Henry, with Montcalm not far behind.  Early on the morning of 3 August, Lévis and the Canadians blocked the road between Edward and William Henry, skirmishing with the recently arrived Massachusetts militia.  Montcalm summoned Monro to surrender at 11:00 am.  Monro refused, and sent messengers south to Fort Edward, indicating the dire nature of the situation and requesting reinforcements.  Webb, feeling threatened by Lévis, refused to send any of his estimated 1,600 men north, since they were all that stood between the French and Albany.  He wrote to Monro on 4 August that he should negotiate the best terms possible; this communication was intercepted and delivered to Montcalm.

Montcalm, in the meantime, ordered Bourlamaque to begin siege operations. The French opened trenches to the northwest of the fort with the objective of bringing their artillery to bear against the fort's northwest bastion. The next day a second battery opened fire from  further along the same trench, creating a crossfire. The effect of the garrison's return fire was limited to driving French guards from the trenches, and some of the fort's guns either were dismounted or burst owing to the stress of use. On 7 August, Montcalm sent Bougainville to the fort under a truce flag to deliver the intercepted dispatch. By then the fort's walls had been breached, many of its guns were useless, and the garrison had taken many casualties. After another day of bombardment by the French, during which their trenches approached another , Monro raised the white flag to open negotiations.

Massacre
The terms of surrender were that the British and their camp followers would be allowed to withdraw, under French escort, to Fort Edward, with the full honours of war, on condition that they refrain from fighting for 18 months. They were allowed to keep their muskets and a single symbolic cannon, but no ammunition. In addition, British authorities were to release French prisoners within three months.

Montcalm, before agreeing to these terms, tried to make sure that his Indian allies understood them, and that the chiefs would undertake to restrain their men. This process was complicated by the diversity within the Indian camp, which included some warriors who spoke languages not understood by any European present. The British garrison was then evacuated from the fort to the entrenched camp, and Monro was quartered in the French camp. The Indians then entered the fort and plundered it, butchering some of the wounded and sick that the British had left behind. The French guards posted around the entrenched camp were only somewhat successful at keeping the Indians out of that area, and it took much effort to prevent plunder and scalping there. Montcalm and Monro initially planned to march the prisoners south the following morning, but after seeing the Indian bloodlust, decided to attempt the march that night. When the Indians became aware that the British were getting ready to move, many of them massed around the camp, causing the leaders to call off the march until morning.

The next morning, even before the British column began to form up for the march to Fort Edward, the Indians renewed attacks on the largely defenceless British. At 5 a.m., Indians entered huts in the fort housing wounded British who were supposed to be under the care of French doctors, and killed and scalped them. Monro complained that the terms of capitulation had been violated, but his contingent was forced to surrender some of its baggage in order to be able even to begin the march. As they marched off, they were harassed by the swarming Indians, who snatched at them, grabbing for weapons and clothing, and pulling away with force those that resisted their actions, including many of the women, children, servants and slaves. As the last of the men left the encampment, a war whoop sounded, and a contingent of Abenaki warriors seized several men at the rear of the column.

Although Montcalm and other French officers attempted to stop further attacks, others did not, and some explicitly refused to provide further protection to the British. At this point, the column dissolved, as some tried to escape the Indian onslaught, while others actively tried to defend themselves. Massachusetts Colonel Joseph Frye reported that he was stripped of much of his clothing and repeatedly threatened. He fled into the woods, and did not reach Fort Edward until 12 August.

Estimates of the numbers killed, wounded, and taken captive during this time vary widely. Ian Steele has compiled estimates ranging from 200 to 1,500. His detailed reconstruction of the siege and its aftermath indicates that the final tally of British missing and dead ranges from 69 to 184, at most 7.5% of the 2,308 who surrendered.

Aftermath

On the afternoon after the massacre, most of the Indians left, heading back to their homes.  Montcalm was able to secure the release of 500 captives they had taken, but they still took with them another 200.  The French remained at the site for several days, destroying what remained of the British works before leaving on 18 August and returning to Fort Carillon.  For unknown reasons, Montcalm decided not to follow up his victory with an attack on Fort Edward.  Many reasons have been proposed justifying his decision, including the departure of many (but not all) of the Indians, a shortage of provisions, the lack of draft animals to assist in the portage to the Hudson, and the need for the Canadian militia to return home in time to participate in the harvest.

Word of the French movements had reached the influential British Indian agent William Johnson on 1 August.  Unlike Webb, he acted with haste, and arrived at Fort Edward on 6 August with 1,500 militia and 150 Indians.  In a move that infuriated Johnson, Webb refused to allow him to advance toward Fort William Henry, apparently believing a French deserter's report that the French army was 11,000 men strong, and that any attempt at relief was futile given the available forces.

Return of captives
On 14 August, Montcalm wrote letters to Loudoun and Webb, apologising for the behaviour of the Indians, but also attempting to justify it.  Many captives that were taken to Montreal by the Indians were also eventually repatriated through prisoner exchanges negotiated by Governor Vaudreuil.  On 27 September a small British fleet left Quebec, carrying paroled or exchanged prisoners taken in a variety of actions including those at Fort William Henry and Oswego.  When the fleet arrived at Halifax, about 300 people captured at Fort William Henry were returned to the colonies.  The fleet continued to Europe, where a few more former captives were released; some of these also eventually returned to the colonies.

Consequences
General Webb was recalled because of his actions; William Johnson wrote that Webb was "the only Englishman [I] ever knew who was a coward."  Lord Loudoun was also recalled, although this occurred primarily because of the failure of the Louisbourg expedition.  Colonel Monro died in November 1757, of apoplexy that some historians have suggested was caused by anger over Webb's failure to support him.

Lord Loudoun, upset over the event, delayed implementing the release of French prisoners promised as part of the terms of surrender.  General James Abercrombie, who succeeded Loudoun as commander-in-chief, was asked by paroled members of the 35th Foot to void the agreement so that they would be free to serve in 1758;  this he did, and they went on to serve under General Jeffery Amherst in his successful British expedition against Louisbourg in 1758. Amherst, who also presided over the surrender of Montreal in 1760, refused the surrendering garrisons at Louisbourg and Montreal the normal honours of war, due in part to the French failure to uphold the terms of capitulation in this action.

Legacy

The British (and later Americans) never rebuilt anything on the site of Fort William Henry, which lay in ruins for about 200 years. In the 1950s, excavation at the site eventually led to the reconstruction of Fort William Henry as a tourist destination for the town of Lake George.

Many colonial accounts of the time focused on the plundering perpetrated by the Indians, and the fact that those who resisted them were killed, using words like "massacre" even though casualty numbers were uncertain. The later releases of captives did not receive the same level of press coverage. The events of the battle and subsequent killings were depicted in the 1826 novel The Last of the Mohicans by James Fenimore Cooper and in film adaptations of the book. Cooper's description of the events contains numerous inaccuracies, but his work, and the sometimes lurid descriptions of the event by early historians like Benson Lossing and Francis Parkman, led to the belief that many more people died than actually did. Lossing wrote that "fifteen hundred [people] were butchered or carried into hopeless captivity", when many more were captured than killed, and even many of those captured were eventually freed.

Historians disagree on where to assign responsibility for the Indian actions. Francis Jennings contends that Montcalm anticipated what was going to happen, deliberately ignored it when it did happen, and stepped in only after the atrocities were well under way. In his opinion, the account by Bougainville, who left for Montreal on the night of 9 August and was not present at the massacre, was written as a whitewash to protect Montcalm.  Parkman is more vigorous in his defence of Montcalm, claiming that he and other French officers did what they could to prevent atrocities, but were powerless to stop the onslaught.

Ian Steele notes that two primary accounts dominate much of the historical record. The first is the record compiled by Montcalm, including the terms of surrender and his letters to Webb and Loudoun, which received wide publication in the colonies (both French and British) and in Europe. The second was the 1778 publication of a book by Jonathan Carver, an explorer who served in the Massachusetts militia and was present at the siege. According to Steele, Carver originated, without any supporting analysis or justification, the idea that as many as 1,500 people had been "killed or made prisoner" in his widely popular work. Yale College president Timothy Dwight, in a history published posthumously in 1822, apparently coined the phrase "massacre at Fort William Henry", based on Carver's work; his book and Carver's were likely influences on Cooper, and tended to fault Montcalm for the Indian transgressions. Steele himself adopts a more nuanced view of the underlying cause of the massacre. Montcalm and the French leaders repeatedly promised the Indians opportunities for the glory and trophies of war, including plunder, scalping, and the taking of captives. In the aftermath of the Battle of Sabbath Day Point, captives taken were ransomed, meaning the Indians had no visible trophies. The terms of surrender at Fort William Henry effectively denied the Indians appreciable opportunities for plunder: the war provisions were claimed by the French army, and personal effects of the British were to stay with them, leaving nothing for the Indians. According to Steele, this decision bred resentment, as it appeared that the French were conspiring with their enemies (the British) against their friends (the Indians), leaving them without any promised war trophies.

Notes

References

Further reading

External links
 An account of two attacks on Fort William Henry
 History of the 35th Foot in the French and Indian War
 The Siege of Fort William Henry, Video Documentary

Fort William Henry
1757 in North America
Fort William Henry
Fort William Henry 1757
Fort William Henry 1757
Fort William Henry 1757
Massacres by Native Americans
1757 in the Province of New York
Massacres committed by France
Massacres in 1757